The 52nd NAACP Image Awards, presented by the NAACP, honored outstanding representations and achievements of people of color in motion pictures, television, music, and literature during the 2020 calendar year. The ceremony aired on March 27, 2021, on BET and simulcast on several of its sister ViacomCBS Networks, with CBS airing the ceremony for the first time. The ceremony was hosted for the eighth time by actor Anthony Anderson. Presentations of untelevised categories were livestreamed between March 22–26, 2021 on the ceremony's website.

The nominations were announced on February 4, 2021. During the ceremony, the Hall of Fame Award was given to Eddie Murphy for "his contributions to the African-American film industry", LeBron James was awarded with the President's Award for "his contributions in the fight for social justice", and Rev. D. James Lawson was awarded with the Chairman's Award "to recognize his work as a social change advocate and his significant contributions to the civil rights movement, specifically the essential role in the south's nonviolent protests in the 1960s". For the first time in the history of the awards ceremony, categories were created to honor animated works in film and television, and the category for voice-over work was broken into two separate categories, respectively for film and television.

All nominees are listed below, and the winners are listed in bold.

Special awards

Motion picture

Television and streaming

Drama

Comedy

Television movie, limited-series or dramatic special

Overall acting

Reality and variety

Other categories

Recording

Literary

References

External links
 NAACP Image Awards official site

NAACP Image Awards
NAACP
NAACP
NAACP
NAACP
NAACP